Hemispherical photography, also known as canopy photography, is a technique to estimate solar radiation and characterize plant canopy geometry using photographs taken looking upward through an extreme wide-angle lens or a fisheye lens (Rich 1990).  Typically, the viewing angle approaches or equals 180-degrees, such that all sky directions are simultaneously visible.  The resulting photographs record the geometry of visible sky, or conversely the geometry of sky obstruction by plant canopies or other near-ground features.  This geometry can be measured precisely and used to calculate solar radiation transmitted through (or intercepted by) plant canopies, as well as to estimate aspects of canopy structure such as leaf area index.  Detailed treatments of field and analytical methodology have been provided by Paul Rich (1989, 1990) and Robert Pearcy (1989).

History

The hemispherical lens (also known as a fisheye or whole-sky lens) was originally designed by Robin Hill (1924) to view the entire sky for meteorological studies of cloud formation.  Foresters and ecologists conceived of using photographic techniques to study the light environment in forests by examining the canopy geometry.  In particular, Evans and Coombe (1959) estimated sunlight penetration through forest canopy openings by overlaying diagrams of the sun track on hemispherical photographs.  Later, Margaret Anderson (1964, 1971) provided a thorough theoretical treatment for calculating the transmission of direct and diffuse components of solar radiation through canopy openings using hemispherical photographs.  At that time hemispherical photograph analysis required tedious manual scoring of overlays of sky quadrants and the track of the sun.  With the advent of personal computers, researchers developed digital techniques for rapid analysis of hemispherical photographs (Chazdon and Field 1987, Rich 1988, 1989, 1990, Becker et al. 1989).  In recent years, researchers have started using digital cameras in favor of film cameras, and algorithms are being developed for automated image classification and analysis.  Various commercial software programs have become available for hemispherical photograph analysis, and the technique has been applied for diverse uses in ecology, meteorology, forestry, and agriculture.

Applications

Hemispherical photography has been used successfully in a broad range of applications involving microsite characterization and estimation of the solar radiation near the ground and beneath plant canopies.  For example, hemispherical photography has been used to characterize winter roosting sites for monarch butterflies (Weiss et al. 1991), effects of forest edges (Galo et al. 1991), influence of forest treefall gaps on tree regeneration (Rich et al. 1993), spatial and temporal variability of light in tropical rainforest understory (Clark et al. 1996), impacts of hurricanes on forest ecology (Bellingham et al. 1996), leaf area index for validation of remote sensing (Chen et al. 1997), canopy architecture of boreal forests (Fournier et al. 1997), light environment in old growth temperate rain forests (Weiss 2000), and management of vineyard trellises to make better wine (Weiss et al. 2003).

Theory

Solar Radiation Calculations

Direct and diffuse components of solar radiation are calculated separately (see Earth's radiation balance).  Direct radiation is calculated as the sum of all direct (solar beam) radiation originating from visible (non-obscured) sky directions along the path of the sun. Similarly, diffuse solar radiation is calculated as the sum of all diffuse radiation (scattered from the atmosphere) originating from any visible (non-obscured) sky directions (see diffuse sky radiation). The sum of direct and diffuse components gives global radiation.

These calculations require theoretical or empirical distributions of direct and diffuse radiation in the open, without canopy or other sky obstruction.  Usually calculations are performed for either photosynthetically active radiation (400-700 nanometers) or insolation integrated over all wavelengths, measured in kilowatt-hours per square meter (kW h/m2).

The fundamental assumption is that most solar radiation originates from visible (unobscured) sky directions, a strong first order effect, and that reflected radiation from the canopy or other near-ground features (non-visible or obscured sky directions) is negligible, a small second order effect. Another assumption is that the geometry of visible (non-obscured) sky does not change over the period for which calculations are performed.

Canopy Calculations

Canopy indices, such as leaf area index (LAI), are based on calculation of gap fraction, the proportion of visible (non-obscured) sky as a function of sky direction. Leaf area index is typically calculated as the leaf area per unit ground area that would produce the observed gap fraction distribution, given an assumption of random leaf angle distribution, or a known leaf angle distribution and degree of clumping. The calculation of the LAI using this indirect Method can be very imprecise. For further explanation see leaf area index.

Indices

Direct Site Factor (DSF) is the proportion of direct solar radiation at a given location relative to that in the open, either integrated over time or resolved according to intervals of time of day and/or season.

Indirect Site Factor (ISF) is the proportion of diffuse solar radiation at a given location relative to that in the open, either integrated over time for all sky directions or resolved by sky sector direction.

Global Site Factor (GSF) is the proportion of global solar radiation at a given location relative to that in the open, calculated as the sum of DSF and ISF weighted by the relative contribution of direct versus diffuse components. Sometimes this index is also called Total Side Factor (TSF).

Indices may be uncorrected or corrected for angle of incidence relative to a flat intercepting surface.  Uncorrected values weight solar radiation originating from all directions equally.  Corrected values weight solar radiation by the cosine of the angle of incidence, accounting for actual interception from directions normal to the intercepting surface.

Leaf Area Index is the total leaf surface area per unit ground area.

Gap Fraction (GapF) is the amount in percent of canopy in relation to the whole measuring zone.

Methodology

Hemispherical photography entails five steps: photograph acquisition, digitization, registration,  classification, and calculation.  Registration, classification, and calculation are accomplished using dedicated hemispherical photography analysis software.

Photograph acquisition

Upward-looking hemispherical photographs are typically acquired under uniform sky lighting, early or late in the day or under overcast conditions.  Known orientation (zenith and azimuth) is essential for proper registration with the analysis hemispherical coordinate system.  Even lighting is essential for accurate image classification.  A self-leveling mount (gimbals) can facilitate acquisition by ensuring that the camera is oriented to point straight up toward the zenith.  The camera is typically oriented such that north (absolute or magnetic) is oriented toward the top of the photograph.

The lens used in hemispherical photography is generally a circular fisheye, such as the Nikkor 8mm fisheye lens. Full-frame fisheye are not suitable for hemispherical photography, as they only capture a full 180° across the diagonal, and do not provide a complete hemispherical view.

In the early years of the technique, most hemispherical photographs were acquired with 35 mm cameras (e.g., Nikon FM2 with a Nikkor 8mm fisheye lens) using high contrast, high ASA black-and-white film.  Later, use of color film or slides became common.  Recently most photographs are acquired using digital cameras (e.g., Kodak DCS Pro 14nx with a Nikkor 8mm fisheye lens).

When images are acquired from locations with large differences in openness (for example, closed canopy locations and canopy gaps) it is essential to control camera exposure. If the camera is allowed to automatically adjust exposure (which is controlled by aperture and shutter speed), the result is that small openings in closed conditions will be bright, whereas openings of the same size in open conditions will be darker (for example, canopy areas around a gap). This means that during image analysis the same-sized holes will be interpreted as "sky" in a closed-canopy image and "canopy" in the open-canopy image. Without controlling exposure, the real differences between closed- and open-canopy conditions will be underestimated.

Digitization

Photographs are digitized and saved in standard image formats.  For film cameras this step requires a negative or slide scanner or a video digitizer.  For digital cameras this step occurs as photographs are acquired.

Registration

Photograph registration involves aligning the photographs with the hemispherical coordinate system used for analysis, in terms of translation (centering), size (coincidence of photograph edges and horizon in coordinate system), and rotation (azimuthal alignment with respect to compass directions).

Classification

Photograph classification involves determining which image pixels represent visible (non-obscured) versus non-visible (obscured) sky directions.  Typically this has been accomplished using interactive thresholding, whereby an appropriate threshold is selected to best match a binary classification with observed sky visibility, with pixel intensity values above the threshold classified as visible and pixel intensity values below the threshold classified as non-visible.  Recently advances have been made in developing automatic threshold algorithms, however more work is still needed before these are fully reliable.

Calculation

Hemispherical photograph calculation uses algorithms that compute gap fraction as function of sky direction, and compute desired canopy geometry and/or solar radiation indices.  For solar radiation, rapid calculation is often accomplished using pre-calculated lookup tables of theoretical or empirical solar radiation values resolved by sky sector or position in the sunpath.

See also
 Leaf area index
 Panoramic photography
 View factor
 Whole sky camera

References 

Anderson, M.C.  1964.  Studies of the woodland light climate I. The photographic computation of light condition.  Journal of Ecology 52:27-41.
Anderson, M.C.  1971.  Radiation and crop structure. pp. 77–90. In: Z. Sestak, J. Catsky and P. G. Jarvis (eds).  Plant Photosynthetic Production Manual of Methods.  Junk.  The Hague.
Becker, P., D. W. Erhart, and A. P. Smith.  1989.  Analysis of forest light environments Part I. Computerized estimation of solar radiation from hemispherical canopy photographs.  Agricultural and Forest Meteorology 44:217-232.
 Bellingham, P.J., E.V.J. Tanner, P.M. Rich, and T.C.R. Goodland. 1996. Changes in light below the canopy of a Jamaican montane rain forest after a hurricane. Journal of Tropical Ecology 12:699–722.
 Bonhomme, R., C. Varlet Granger, and P. Chartier.  1974.  The use of hemispherical photographs for determining the leaf area index of young crops. Photosynthetica 8:299-301.
 Breshears, D.D., P.M. Rich, F.J. Barnes, and K. Campbell. 1997. Overstory–imposed heterogeneity in solar radiation and soil moisture in a semiarid woodland. Ecological Applications 7:1201–1215.
 Chazdon R.L. and C.B. Field. 1987.  Photographic estimation of photosynthetically active radiation: evaluation of a computerized technique.  Oecologia  73: (4) 525-532.
 Chen, J.M., and J. Cihlar.  1995.  Plant canopy gap size analysis theory for improving optical measurements of leaf area index.  Applied Optics 34, 6211-6222.
 Chen, J.M., and T.A. Black.  1992.  Defining leaf area index for non-flat leaves.  Plant, Cell and Environment 15:421-429.
 Chen, J.M., P.M. Rich, S.T. Gower, J.M. Norman, and S. Plummer. 1997. Leaf area index of boreal forests: theory, techniques, and measurements. Journal of Geophysical Research, BOREAS Special Issue 102(D24):29429–29444.
 Chen, J.M., T.A. Black, and R.S. Adams.  1991.  Evaluation of hemispherical photography for determining plant area index and geometry of a forest stand.  Agricultural and Forest Meteorology 56:129-143.
 Clark, D.B., D.A. Clark, and P.M. Rich. 1993. Comparative analysis of microhabitat utilization by saplings of nine tree species in neotropical rain forest. Biotropica 25:397–407.
 Clark, D.B., D.A. Clark, P.M. Rich, S.B. Weiss, and S.F. Oberbauer. 1996. Landscape–scale evaluation of understory light and canopy structure: methods and application in a neotropical lowland rain forest. Canadian Journal of Forest Research 26:747–757.
 Evans, G.D., and D.E. Coombe.  1959.  Hemispherical and woodland canopy photography and the light climate.  Journal of Ecology 47:103-113.
 Fournier, R.A., P.M. Rich, and R. Landry. 1997. Hierarchical characterization of canopy architecture for boreal forest. Journal of Geophysical Research, BOREAS Special Issue 102(D24):29445–29454.
 Fournier, R.A., P.M. Rich, Y.R. Alger, V.L. Peterson, R. Landry, and  N.M.  August.  1995. Canopy architecture of boreal forests: links between remote sensing and ecology. American Society for Photogrammetry and Remote Sensing Technical Papers 2:225-235.
 Galo, A.T., P.M. Rich, and J.J. Ewel. 1992. Effects of forest edges on the solar radiation regime in a series of reconstructed tropical ecosystems. American Society for Photogrammetry and Remote Sensing Technical Papers. pp 98–108.
 Gower, S.T. and J.M. Norman.  1991.  Rapid estimation of leaf area index in forests using the LI-COR LAI-2000.  Ecology 72:1896-1900.
 Hill, R.  1924.  A lens for whole sky photographs.  Quarterly Journal of the Royal Meteorological Society 50:227-235.
 Inoue, A., K. Yamamoto, N. Mizoue and Y. Kawahara.  2004.  Effects of image quality, size and camera type on forest light environment estimates using digital hemispherical photography.  Agricultural and Forest Meteorology 126:89-97.
 Inoue, A., K. Yamamoto, N. Mizoue and Y. Kawahara.  2004.  Calibrating view angle and lens distortion of the Nikon fish-eye converter FC-E8.  Journal of Forest Research 9:177-181.
 Inoue, A., K. Yamamoto, N. Mizoue and Y. Kawahara.  2002.  Estimation of relative illuminance using digital hemispherical photography.  Journal of Forest Planning 8:67-70.
 Inoue, A.  1999.  Difference in diffuse site factors due to spatial distribution of sky luminance.  Journal of Forest Planning 5:29-33.
 Jarčuška, B. 2008. Methodical overview to hemispherical photography, demonstrated on an example of the software GLA. Folia Oecologica 35:66–69.  
 Landry, R., R.A. Fournier, F.J. Ahern, and R.H. Lang.  1997.  Tree Vectorization: a methodology to characterize tree architecture in support of remote sensing models.  Canadian Journal of Remote Sensing 23:91-107.
 Lang, A.R.G.  1986.  Leaf area and average leaf angle from transmittance of direct sunlight.  Australian Journal of Botany 34:349-355.
 Lang, A.R.G., R.E. McMurtrie, and M.L. Benson.  1991.  Validity of surface area indices of Pinus radiata estimated from transmittance of the sun's beam.  Agricultural and Forest Meteorology 37:229-243.
 Lerdau, M.T., Holbrook, N.M., H.A. Mooney, P.M. Rich, and J.L. Whitbeck.  1992.  Seasonal patterns of acid fluctuations and resource storage in the arborescent cactus Opuntia excelsa in relation to light availability and size.  Oecologia 92:166-171.
 Lin, T., P.M. Rich, D.A. Heisler, and F.J. Barnes.  1992. Influences of canopy geometry on near-ground solar radiation and water balances of pinyon-juniper and ponderosa pine woodlands. American Society for Photogrammetry and Remote Sensing Technical Papers.  pp. 285–294.
 Miller, J.B.  1967.  A formula for average foliage density. Australian Journal of Botany 15:141-144.
 Mitchell, P.L. and T.C. Whitmore.  1993.  Use of hemispherical photographs in forest ecology:  calculation of absolute amount of radiation beneath the canopy.  Oxford Forestry Institute. Oxford, United Kingdom.
 Neumann, H.H., G.D. Den Hartog, and R.H. Shaw.  1989.  Leaf area measurements based on hemispheric photographs and leaf-litter collection in a deciduous forest during autumn leaf-fall. Agricultural and Forest Meteorology 45:325-345.
 Norman, J. M. and G. S. Campbell  1989.  Canopy structure.  pp. 301–326.  In: R. W. Pearcy, J. Ehleringer, H. A. Mooney, and P. W. Rundel (eds).  Plant physiological ecology: field methods and instrumentation.  Chapman and Hall.  London.
 Oberbauer, S.F., D.B. Clark, D.A. Clark, P.M. Rich, and G. Vega. 1993. Light environment, gas exchange, and annual growth of saplings of three species of rain forest trees in Costa Rica. Journal of Tropical Ecology 9:511–523.
 Pearcy, R.W.  1989.  Radiation and light measurements.  pp. 95–116.  In:  R.W. Pearcy, J. Ehleringer, H.A. Mooney, and P.W. Rundel (eds), Plant Physiological Ecology:  Field Methods and Instrumentation.  Chapman and Hall.  New York.
 Reifsnyder, W.E.  1967.  Radiation geometry in the measurement and interpretation of radiation balance.  Agricultural and Forest Meteorology 4:255-265.
 Rich, P.M.  1988.  Video image analysis of hemispherical canopy photography.  In:  P.W. Mausel (ed), First Special Workshop on Videography.  Terre Haute, Indiana.  May 19–20, 1988, 'American Society for Photogrammetry and Remote Sensing', pp. 84–95.
 Rich, P.M.  1989.  A manual for analysis of hemispherical canopy photography.  Los Alamos National Laboratory Report LA-11733-M.  
 Rich, P.M.  1990.  Characterizing plant canopies with hemispherical photographs.  In:  N.S. Goel and J.M. Norman (eds), Instrumentation for studying vegetation canopies for remote sensing in optical and thermal infrared regions.  Remote Sensing Reviews 5:13-29.
 Rich, P.M., D.A. Clark, D.B. Clark, and S.F. Oberbauer. 1993. Long–term study of solar radiation regimes in a tropical wet forest using quantum sensors and hemispherical photography. Agricultural and Forest Meteorology 65:107–127.
 Rich, P.M., R. Dubayah, W.A. Hetrick, and S.C. Saving. 1994. Using viewshed models to calculate intercepted solar radiation: applications in ecology. American Society for Photogrammetry and Remote Sensing Technical Papers. pp 524–529.
 Rich, P.M., D.M. Ranken, and J.S. George. 1989. A manual for microcomputer image analysis. Los Alamos National Laboratory Report LA–11732–M.  
 Rich, P.M., J. Chen, S.J. Sulatycki, R. Vashisht, and W.S. Wachspress.  1995.  Calculation of leaf area index and other canopy indices from gap fraction:  a manual for the LAICALC software.  Kansas Applied Remote Sensing Program Open File Report.  Lawrence, KS.  
 Rich, P.M., J. Wood, D.A. Vieglais, K. Burek, and N. Webb. 1999. Guide to HemiView: software for analysis of hemispherical photography. Delta–T Devices, Ltd., Cambridge, England.
 Rich, P.M., N.M. Holbrook, and N. Luttinger. 1995. Leaf development and crown geometry of two iriarteoid palms. American Journal of Botany 82:328–336.
 Shaw, D.C., and S.B. Weiss. 2000.  Canopy light and the distribution of hemlock dwarf mistletoe (Arceuthobium tsugenses [Rosendahl] G.N. Jones subsp. tsugense) aerial shoots in an old-growth Douglas-fir/western hemlock forest.  Northwest Science 74:306-315
 Turner, I.M.  1990.  Tree seedling growth and survival in a Malaysian rain forest.  Biotropica, 22:146-154.
 Turton, S.M.  1988.  Solar radiation regimes in a north Queensland rainforest.  Proceedings of the Ecological Society of Australia, 15:101-105.
 Weiss, S.B. 00. Vertical and temporal patterns of insolation in an old-growth forest. Canadian Journal of Forest Research 30:1953-1964
 Weiss, S.B., P.M. Rich, D.D. Murphy, W.H. Calvert, P.R. Ehrlich.  1991.  Forest canopy structure at overwintering monarch butterfly sites:  measurements with hemispherical photography.  Conservation Biology 5:165-175.
 Weiss, S.B., and D.C. Luth. 2002. Assessment of overwintering monarch butterfly habitat at Cooper Grove (Andrew Molera State Park, Monterey County, CA) using hemispherical photography. Creekside Center for Earth Observation Report, Menlo Park, CA.
 Weiss, S.B., D.C. Luth, and B. Guerra. 2003.  Potential solar radiation in a VSP trellis at 38°N latitude.  Practical Winery and Vineyard 25:16-27.
 Weiss, S.B., et al. 2005. Topoclimate and microclimate in the Monarch Butterfly Biosphere Reserve (Mexico).  World Wildlife Fund Project. Creekside Center for Earth Observation Report, Menlo Park, CA.
 Welles, J.M.  1990.  Some indirect methods of estimating canopy structure.  Remote Sensing Reviews 5:31-43.

Forest modelling
Microscale meteorology
Remote sensing
Atmospheric radiation
Climate forcing
Photographic techniques